TSC may refer to:

Organizations
 Technology Service Corporation, a US engineering company
 Terrorist Screening Center, a division of the National Security Branch of the US Federal Bureau of Investigation
 The Shopping Channel, a Canadian television network
 The Soufan Center, an independent research center on global security matters
 The Support Center, in Durham, North Carolina, US
 Tractor Supply Company, a US farm supply and home-improvement retail chain
 The Spaceship Company, a British/American spaceship manufacturing company
 Technical Systems Consultants, a defunct supplier of software for SWTPC computers
 Teridian Semiconductor, a fabless semiconductor company in Irvine, California, US
 Air Transat (ICAO code), an airline based in Montreal, Canada
 The Transport Systems Catapult, which in April 2019 became the Connected Places Catapult
 TSC Bačka Topola, a Serbian association football club

Education
 Teacher-Student Centre, University of Dhaka, Bangladesh
 Texas Southmost College, a community college in Brownsville, US
 Thebarton Senior College, a public school in Adelaide, Australia
 Time to Succeed Coalition, an education non-profit in Boston, US
 Training Ship "Chanakya", a nautical science college in Mumbai, India
 The Scots College, a private school in Sydney, Australia
 Teachers Service Commission A Kenyan organization that registers, employs, promotes and pays Kenyan teachers
 Trinidad State College, a public community college in Trinidad, Colorado

Science and technology
 Thiazide-sensitive Na-Cl cotransporter, a carrier protein inhibited by so-called thiazides
 Tuberous sclerosis complex, a rare genetic disorder
 Tuberous sclerosis protein, the associated protein
 Trans sodium crocetinate, an oxygen diffusion-enhancing compound
 Thyristor switched capacitor, a feature in some AC power transmission systems

Computing
 Time Stamp Counter, an internal clock present in the IA-32 architecture since the Pentium processor
 Terminal Services Client, software for remote control of Microsoft windows

Arts and entertainment
 Ten Silver Coins, a 2009 novel
 TV Setouchi, a TV station in Japan
 The Shopping Channel, a cable television network available in Canada
 Tech Support Comedy, a web-based community for tech support workers
 The Secret Circle (TV series), an American television series

Other uses
 FK TSC Bačka Topola, a Serbian football club
 The Standard Code of Parliamentary Procedure, a manual on US parliamentary law
 Texas State Cemetery, in Austin, Texas, US
 Total Sanitation Campaign, former name of a program in India
 Turkvision Song Contest, a song contest for countries and regions which are of Turkic-speaking or Turkic ethnicity.